Reply is a South Korean anthology television series directed by Shin Won-ho with teleplay by Lee Woo-jung that premiered in 2012 on cable network tvN. It revolves around a group of friends, as the timeline moves back and forth between their past and present selves.

The series received acclaim from critics for its performances and soundtrack in addition to being a well-researched production full of humor and heart. It has also recorded consistent high audience ratings with Reply 1988 peaking at 18.8% nationwide, making it the (currently fifth) highest rated drama in Korean cable television history.

Seasons

Season 1: Reply 1997

Set in 1997, the drama centers around a female high school student Shi Won, who idolizes boyband H.O.T. and her 5 high school friends in Busan. As the timeline moves back and forth between their past as 18-year-old high schoolers in 1997 and their present as 33-year-olds at their high school reunion dinner in 2012, one couple will announce that they're getting married.

Season 2: Reply 1994

Set in 1994, six university students from various provincial areas live together at a boarding house in Sinchon, Seoul, run by a couple with a daughter named Na Jung. The timeline moves back and forth between the past in 1994 and the present in 2013, making the viewers guess who will become Na Jung's husband among the male characters. The series follows the pop culture events that happened between 1994 and the years that follow, including the emergence of seminal K-pop group Seo Taiji and Boys and the Korean Basketball League.

Season 3: Reply 1988

Set in the year 1988, it revolves around five friends and their families living in the same neighborhood of Ssangmun-dong, Dobong District, Northern Seoul.

Cast

Notes
 1 Cameo appearance only.
 2 Supporting character.

References

External links
 Reply 1997
 Reply 1994
 Reply 1988

Korean-language television shows
2012 South Korean television series debuts
2016 South Korean television series endings
2010s teen drama television series
TVN (South Korean TV channel) television dramas
Television series set in 1988
Television series set in 1994
Television series set in 1997
South Korean anthology television series